Jonathan Afolabi (born 14 January 2000) is an Irish footballer who plays as a striker for Bohemians. His previous clubs include Celtic, Dunfermline Athletic, Dundee, Ayr United and Airdrieonians.

Club career

Early career
Born and raised in Dublin, Republic of Ireland, Afolabi played his youth football with Shamrock Rovers, Lourdes Celtic, and St Joseph's Boys before earning a move to the Academy of Premier League club Southampton.

Celtic
On 21 August 2019, Afolabi joined Scottish Premiership Champions Celtic.

After various loan spells, his contract was not renewed on expiry at the end of June 2022.

Dunfermline Athletic (loan)
On 27 January 2020, Afolabi signed for Dunfermline Athletic of the Scottish Championship on loan until the end of the season. His debut in senior football came on 1 February 2020, in a 3–2 win away to Queen of the South. He made 6 appearances for the club, scoring 2 goals before the season was ended prematurely due to the COVID-19 pandemic.

Dundee (loan)
On 29 September 2020, Afolabi joined Dundee on a season-long loan. He scored his first goal for the club at home in the league against Greenock Morton. He scored against Hearts and Ayr United in crucial games for Dundee as they won the promotion playoffs in the 2020/21 season.

Ayr United (loan)
On the 2nd August 2021, Afolabi signed for Ayr United on loan until the end of the season.

Airdrieonians (loan)
On 11 February 2022, Afolabi was recalled from Ayr and was immediately sent on loan to Scottish League One side Airdrieonians for the rest of the season.

Bohemians
On 5 August 2022, Afolabi returned home to Dublin, signing for League of Ireland Premier Division club Bohemians.

International career
Afolabi was born in Ireland to Nigerian parents. Afolabi has played for the Republic of Ireland right up to Under-21 level. On 31 July 2019 he was named in the 2019 UEFA European Under-19 Championship Team of the Tournament, alongside Ferran Torres & Félix Correia in the forward positions. He scored his first goal for the Republic of Ireland U21s on 26 March 2021 in a 2–1 friendly win over Wales U21 in Wrexham.

Career statistics

References

External links
 
  

2000 births
Living people
Association footballers from Dublin (city)
Republic of Ireland association footballers
Republic of Ireland youth international footballers
Republic of Ireland under-21 international footballers
Republic of Ireland expatriate association footballers
Irish expatriate sportspeople in England
Expatriate footballers in England
Irish expatriate sportspeople in Scotland
Expatriate footballers in Scotland
Association football forwards
Southampton F.C. players
Celtic F.C. players
Dundee F.C. players
Dunfermline Athletic F.C. players
Scottish Professional Football League players
Irish people of Nigerian descent
Irish sportspeople of African descent
Black Irish sportspeople
Ayr United F.C. players
Airdrieonians F.C. players
Bohemian F.C. players
League of Ireland players